Mario Antonio Macias Orozco (born 25 July 1985) is a Mexican professional boxer who challenged for the WBA bantamweight title in 2011.

Professional career
On 7 December 2011, Macias fought Kōki Kameda in Osaka for the WBA bantamweight title. He was knocked out in the fourth round.

References

External links

Living people
1985 births
Mexican male boxers
Bantamweight boxers
Boxers from Mexico City